The Spectacular Spider-Man is a comic book and magazine series starring Spider-Man and published by Marvel Comics.

Following the success of Spider-Man's original series, The Amazing Spider-Man, Marvel felt the character could support more than one title. This led the company in 1968 to launch a short-lived magazine, the first to bear the Spectacular name. In 1972, Marvel more successfully launched a second Spider-Man ongoing series, Marvel Team-Up, in which he was paired with other Marvel heroes. A third monthly ongoing series, Peter Parker, The Spectacular Spider-Man, debuted in 1976.

Magazine (1968) 
The Spectacular Spider-Man was initially a two-issue magazine published by Marvel in 1968, Each issue was written by Paul Jenkins (except #23–26, by Samm Barnes). The book's primary pencillers were Humberto Ramos and Mark Buckingham.

The comic included the storyline Spider-Man: Disassembled in which Spider-Man met a new enemy called the Queen who wanted him as her mate. Her kiss caused him to slowly mutate into a giant spider who metamorphosed into human form with enhanced strength and agility, along with organic webbing and a psychic link with insects and arachnids.

This comic also included the sequel to "Sins Past", "Sins Remembered", in which Peter went to Paris to meet Sarah Stacy and resolved the issues between them.

Spectacular Spider-Man Adventures
Spectacular Spider-Man Adventures was a title published by Panini Comics in the United Kingdom from November 1995 to September 2005, although the Adventures portion of the title was often dropped from the cover page. It featured a mix of reprinted American material, as well as originally produced British material.  Spectacular was aimed at a younger audience than Panini's other Spider-Man reprint title Astonishing Spider-Man and was loosely based on the continuity of the 1990s animated series.

Volume 3 (2017–18)
Peter Parker: The Spectacular Spider-Man (vol. 3) was published from June 2017 to December 2018. After the first six issues, the series reverted to legacy numbering with issue #297 as part of the line-wide Marvel Legacy relaunch. The series' original creative team had Chip Zdarsky as writer, with Adam Kubert providing the artwork. Notable recurring characters included Teresa Durand, J. Jonah Jameson, Johnny Storm, and original character Rebecca London.

Various issues, as well as the one Annual, were illustrated by guest artists; Kubert's final issue as artist was #307, excluding covers. Zdarsky left the series with issue #310. The series ended with issue #313, the final three issues being a tie-in to the Spider-Geddon crossover event written by Sean Ryan.

Collected editions 
 Essential Peter Parker, the Spectacular Spider-Man 
 Volume 1 collects issues #1–31, 568 pages, May 2005,  
 Volume 2 collects issues #32–53, Annual #1–2, 592 pages, February 2006,  
 Volume 3 collects issues #54–74, Annual #3, 536 pages, March 2007,   
 Volume 4 collects issues #75–96, Annual #4, 576 pages, August 2009,  
 Volume 5 collects issues #97–114, Annual #5, 576 pages, July 2011, 
 Spider-Man: The Original Clone Saga includes #25–31, 149, 162–163, Annual #8, 496 pages, July 2011,  
 Spider-Man by Roger Stern Omnibus includes #43–61, 85, Annual #3, 1296 pages, April 2014, 
 Spider-Man: Origin of the Hobgoblin 
 First printing includes #85, 160 pages, May 1993,  
 Second printing includes #43, 47–48, 85, 256 pages, December 2011, 
 Spider-Man: The Complete Alien Costume Saga 
 Book 1 includes #90–95, 488 pages, August 2014, 
 Book 2 includes #96–100, Annual #4, 504 pages, May 2015, 
 Life in the Mad Dog Ward – includes #133, 144 pages, November 2013, 
 Tombstone – includes #137–150, 368 pages, June 2016, 
 The Amazing Spider-Man: The Death of Jean DeWolff 
 First printing collects #107–110, 96 pages, April 1991,  
 Second printing collects #107–110, 134–136, 168 pages, March 2013,  
 Secret Wars II Omnibus includes Peter Parker, the Spectacular Spider-Man #111, 1,184 pages, May 2009,  
 Spider-Man vs. Silver Sable Vol. 1 includes #128–129, 144 pages, January 2006,  
 The Amazing Spider-Man – Fearful Symmetry: Kraven's Last Hunt includes #131–132, 164 pages, December 1991, 
 The Evolutionary War Omnibus includes Spectacular Spider-Man Annual #8, 472 pages, September 2011, 
 Atlantis Attacks Omnibus includes Spectacular Spider-Man Annual #9, 552 pages, March 2011, 
 Spider-Man: The Cosmic Adventures includes #158–160, 192 pages, March 1993, 
 Acts of Vengeance Omnibus includes #158–160, 744 pages, March 2011, 
 Spider-Man: Son of the Goblin includes Spectacular Spider-Man #189 and 200, 144 pages, July 2004,  
 Maximum Carnage includes Spectacular Spider-Man #201–203, 336 pages, December 2006,  
 Spider-Man and the New Warriors: Hero Killers includes Spectacular Spider-Man Annual #12, 232 pages, March 2012, 
 Spider-Man: The Complete Clone Saga Epic 
 Book 1 includes Spectacular Spider-Man #217, 424 pages, April 2010,  
 Book 2 includes Spectacular Spider-Man #218–221, 480 pages, June 2010,  
 Book 3 includes Spectacular Spider-Man #222–224, 464 pages, September 2010,  
 Book 4 includes Spectacular Spider-Man #225–227, 480 pages, December 2010,  
 Book 5 includes Spectacular Spider-Man #228–229 and Spectacular Spider-Man Super Special #1, 472 pages, February 2011,  
 Spider-Man: The Complete Ben Reilly Epic 
 Book 2 includes Spectacular Spider-Man #230, 424 pages, November 2011,  
 Book 3 includes Spectacular Spider-Man #231–233, 432 pages, January 2012,  
 Book 4 includes Spectacular Spider-Man #234, 464 pages, April 2012,  
 Book 5 includes Spectacular Spider-Man #235–239, 464 pages, July 2012,  
 Book 6 includes Spectacular Spider-Man #240–241, 448 pages, November 2012,  
 Spider-Man: Revelations includes Spectacular Spider-Man #240, 112 pages, October 1997,  
 Spider-Man: Spider-Hunt includes Spectacular Spider-Man #254–256, 272 pages, June 2012,  
 Spider-Man: Identity Crisis includes Spectacular Spider-Man #257–258, 200 pages, May 2012,  
 Spider-Man: Hobgoblin Lives includes Spectacular Spider-Man #259–261, 184 pages, May 2011, 
 Spider-Man: The Gathering of Five includes Spectacular Spider-Man #262–263, 248 pages, January 2014, 
 The Spectacular Spider-Man 
 Vol. 1: The Hunger collects The Spectacular Spider-Man (vol. 2) #1–5, 120 pages, December 2003,  
 Vol. 2: Countdown collects The Spectacular Spider-Man (vol. 2) #6–10, 120 pages, May 2004,  
 Vol. 3: Here There Be Monsters collects The Spectacular Spider-Man (vol. 2) #11–14, 144 pages, October 2004,  
 Vol. 4: Disassembled collects The Spectacular Spider-Man (vol. 2) #15–20, 136 pages, December 2004,  
 Vol. 5: Sins Remembered collects The Spectacular Spider-Man (vol. 2) #23–26, 96 pages, May 2005,  
 Vol. 6: The Final Curtain  collects The Spectacular Spider-Man (vol. 2) #21–22 and 27, 144 pages, October 2005, 
 Peter Parker: The Spectacular Spider-Man
 Vol 1: Into The Twilight collects Peter Parker: The Spectacular Spider-Man (vol. 3) #1–6 and material from Free Comic Book Day 2017 (Secret Empire) #1, 144 pages, December 2017, 
 Vol 2: Most Wanted collects Peter Parker: The Spectacular Spider-Man #297–300, 112 pages, April 2018, 
 Vol 3: Amazing Fantasy collects Peter Parker: The Spectacular Spider-Man #301–303 and Annual #1, 112 pages, August 2018, 
 Vol 4: Coming Home collects Peter Parker: The Spectacular Spider-Man #304–310, 112 pages, December 2018, 
 Vol 5: Spider-Geddon collects Peter Parker: The Spectacular Spider-Man #311–313, Spider-Geddon: Spider-Man Noir Video Comic #1 and Spider-Geddon: Animated Video Comic #1, 112 pages, February 2019,

See also
 List of Spider-Man titles
 Peter Parker: Spider-Man
 The Spectacular Spider-Man (TV series)

References

External links
The Spectacular Spider-Man at the Unofficial Handbook of Marvel Comics Creators

The Trades (Aug. 14, 2002): "Peter David: An Apropos Conversation"

Spider-Man titles
1968 comics debuts
1968 comics endings
1976 comics debuts
1998 comics endings
2003 comics debuts
2005 comics endings
Comics by Archie Goodwin (comics)
Comics by Roger Stern